The Ayoub Sisters are a multi-instrumental musical duo consisting of siblings Sarah and Laura Ayoub. The duo arrange and perform instrumental versions of well-known pop and classical works. Their debut album was recorded in Abbey Road Studios with the Royal Philharmonic Orchestra in partnership with Classic FM and released on Universal's Decca Records in September 2017. Their self-titled album debuted at No. 1 on the Official Classical Artist Albums Charts.

Background 
The duo were brought to public attention when their instrumental cover of "Uptown Funk" was discovered by record producer Mark Ronson. The sisters were invited to Abbey Road Studios by Ronson to produce a cover of the song, which was showcased as part of the BRIT Awards, 2016. In the same year, The Ayoub Sisters made their Royal Albert Hall debut performing as guest soloists with the Royal Scottish National Orchestra.The concert was broadcast on Classic FM Live and as a result, the sisters were offered a record deal with Decca Records.

Early life and education 
The Ayoub Sisters were born in Glasgow to Egyptian immigrant parents. The sisters attended the music school of Douglas Academy. Afterwards, Sarah completed her studies at the Royal Conservatoire of Scotland (2010-2014) and Laura at the Royal College of Music (2013-2017).

Performances 
The Ayoub Sisters have performed internationally across the United Kingdom and Middle East, including performances at the Cairo Opera House. The duo have also toured with Choir Master Gareth Malone.

Television appearances 
The duo made their television debut performing at the 2017 BAFTA's which was held in The Royal Festival Hall. The Ayoub Sisters played at BBC Proms in the Park in Glasgow accompanied by the BBC Scottish Symphony Orchestra on BBC 1. The duo have also been featured on the BBC Big Sing, Songs of Praise and Sky Arts.

The Ayoub Sisters performed the Egyptian National Anthem at the closing ceremony of the World Youth Forum which was attended by H.E Abdel Fattah el Sisi, the president of the Arab Republic of Egypt.

Awards 
The Ayoub Sisters are recipients of the World Youth Forum Award and the Arab Woman of the Year Award. The duo's debut album was also nominated for a Classic BRIT Award in 2018.

Discography 
The Ayoub Sisters - Decca (4815780) - (September 2017)
Arabesque - [2022 The Ayoub Sisters]

References 

Musical groups established in 2015
Sibling musical duos
Sisters
British musical duos
Musical groups from Glasgow
2015 establishments in the United Kingdom